The Serie B 1982–83 was the fifty-first tournament of this competition played in Italy since its creation.

Teams
Atalanta, Monza, Arezzo and Campobasso had been promoted from Serie C, while Milan, Bologna and Como had been relegated from Serie A.

Final classification

Results

Promotion tie-breaker

Catania promoted to Serie A.

References and sources
Almanacco Illustrato del Calcio - La Storia 1898-2004, Panini Edizioni, Modena, September 2005

Serie B seasons
2
Italy